The Mines of Custalcon is a supplement for fantasy role-playing games published by Judges Guild in 1979.

Contents
The Mines of Custalcon is a campaign setting describing a wilderness area, with encounter tables, village descriptions, and a dungeon miniscenario.

Publication history
The Mines of Custalcon was written by Bryan Hinnen, and was published by Judges Guild in 1979 as a 48-page book.

As part of Judges Guild's increased production, they began a new series of City State-related supplements. The Mines of Custalcon (1979) kicked off their "Wilderness Series" which mapped the areas around the City State using Judge Guild's Campaign Hexagon System.

Reception

Reviews
 Different Worlds #6 (Dec 1979)

References

Judges Guild fantasy role-playing game supplements
Role-playing game supplements introduced in 1979